Monumento is the debut album by the Greek metal band Dakrya. It was released worldwide on May 23, 2008.

Track listing 
All music by Sophia Charalampous, except "Reflections and Illusions" by Sophia Charalampous and George Droulias. All lyrics by Sophia Charalampous.

 "Crucifixion of Faith" – 5:33
 "Thorns of Punishment" – 4:46
 "Newborn Hope" – 5:15
 "Reflections and Illusions" – 4:50
 "Waters of Oblivion" – 5:51
 "Inner Scream" – 5:21
 "Revelations of a Madman" – 6:10
 "Into The Vortex" – 4:41
 "The Black Opera (Opus IX)" – 6:54

Bonus Tracks 
 "Wingless Souls" – 3:43

Personnel

Band members 
 Thomais Chatzigianni – Vocals
 Christina Kalantzi – Vocals
 Sophia Charalampous – Keyboards
 George Droulias – Guitars
 Alex Drake – Bass
 Charis Kampitsis – Drums

Production 
 Sophia Charalampous – producer
 Manos Konstantinidis – engineer, mix, master

Additional musicians 
 Panagiotis Matrakas (Nethescerial) – Brutal Vocals
 Thomas Kotrotsios – Declamations

References 

2008 albums
Dakrya albums